Rhaphiomidas nigricaudis is a species of mydas flies (insects in the family Mydidae).

References

Further reading

External links

 Diptera.info
 NCBI Taxonomy Browser, Rhaphiomidas nigricaudis

Mydidae
Insects described in 1986